44 is the sixth solo album by Canadian indie rock musician Joel Plaskett, released on April 17, 2020. Dubbed the "spiritual successor" to Plaskett's prior triple album Three, the 44-song, quadruple album was released the day before the artist's 45th birthday. (As a tie-in to that fact, the LP box set contains a bonus 45th track.) Plaskett recorded the album across Dartmouth, Nova Scotia, Memphis, Nashville and Toronto, having worked with 33 other musicians over four years.

Background
Each of the four records in the album contains 11 songs, with their own title and theme. The first record (41: Carried Away) is centred around travelling, the second collection (42: Just Passing Through) turns to finding a homecoming unfamiliar, the third set (43: If There's Another Road) tackles transitioning from lost to found, and the last record (44: The Window Inn) deals with arriving at a personal destination.

Collaborators include Plaskett's band the Emergency, as well as his former group from the nineties Thrush Hermit; members of Sloan and Local Rabbits; fellow Maritimer and mentee of Plaskett Mo Kenney; Dave Shouse of past bands Grifters and Those Bastard Souls; Nashville-based Canadians Rob Crowell and Steve Dawson; the vocalist trio Reeny, Mahalia and Micah Smith; East Coast songwriters Al Tuck, Rose Cousins, and Erin Costelo; folk singer-songwriters Charlotte Cornfield and Ana Egge; and Plaskett's son, Xianing.

The cross-Canada album tour for 44 had been scheduled for April–May, 2020 but was pushed back to October–November, 2020 due to the 2019-2020 coronavirus pandemic.

Critical reception
A hometown review in Halifax's Chronicle Herald summed up the album as, "autobiographical, philosophical, psychoanalytical and spiritual." Another review called it a mix of everything, an eclectic collection from a prolific artist full of multitudes: "rock and pop, country and folk, loud and quiet, electric and acoustic, earthy and spacey, sincere and silly, gems and duds, studio and live, full-band productions and lo-fi solo fare." One critic described the title single from the third record, If There's Another Road as "comfort food." The expansive album was said to be a "massive, eclectic" reflection on the depth and breadth of the artist's life journey; "an impressive retrospective." Also focusing on the reflective nature of the album, a Globe and Mail review noted how the album was a labour of love to Plaskett's family and friends, and the years-long effort displayed "the value of slowing down to enjoy the moment."

The album was longlisted for the 2020 Polaris Music Prize.

Track listing

References

External links 
 Joel Plaskett Unveils 44 at joelplaskett.com
 Joel Plaskett profile at Pheromone Recordings

2020 albums
Joel Plaskett albums